may refer to:

Japan 
 Fukushima Prefecture, Japanese prefecture
Fukushima, Fukushima, capital city of Fukushima Prefecture, Japan
Fukushima University, national university in Japan
Fukushima Station (Fukushima) in Fukushima, Fukushima
Fukushima Airport, airport serving northern and central Fukushima Prefecture, Japan
Fukushima Daini Nuclear Power Plant, another nuclear power plant in Fukushima Prefecture, Japan. Now being decommissioned
Fukushima Daiichi Nuclear Power Plant, a disabled nuclear power plant in Fukushima Prefecture, Japan
 Fukushima Daiichi nuclear disaster, 2011 nuclear disaster at the Fukushima nuclear power plant, Japan
 Fukushima disaster cleanup, clean-up activities following the nuclear accidents, Fukushima, Japan
 2016 Fukushima earthquake
 2021 Fukushima earthquake

Hokkaido 
Fukushima, Hokkaido

Osaka 
Fukushima-ku, Osaka, ward
Fukushima Station

Nagano Prefecture 
Kiso-Fukushima Station
Fukushima-juku, former post town
 Fukushima Station (disambiguation)

Nagasaki Prefecture 
Fukushima, Nagasaki, former town

Other 
 Fukushima (surname), a Japanese surname
 Fukushima Galilei (formerly Fukushima Industries), Japanese manufacturer of commercial refrigeration equipment

Antarctica 
Mount Fukushima
Fukushima Peak

See also